In enzymology, a 1,4-beta-D-xylan synthase is an enzyme that catalyzes the chemical reaction

UDP-D-xylose + (1,4-beta-D-xylan)n  UDP + (1,4-beta-D-xylan)n1

Thus, the two substrates of this enzyme are UDP-D-xylose and (1,4-beta-D-xylan)n, whereas its two products are UDP and (1,4-beta-D-xylan)n+1.

This enzyme belongs to the family of glycosyltransferases, specifically the pentosyltransferases.  The systematic name of this enzyme class is UDP-D-xylose:1,4-beta-D-xylan 4-beta-D-xylosyltransferase. Other names in common use include uridine diphosphoxylose-1,4-beta-xylan xylosyltransferase, 1,4-beta-xylan synthase, xylan synthase, and xylan synthetase.  This enzyme participates in starch and sucrose metabolism and nucleotide sugars metabolism.

References 

 

EC 2.4.2
Enzymes of unknown structure